Aurat is a 1967 Indian Hindi-language film produced and directed by S. S. Balan and S. S. Vasan. It is a remake of the 1966 Tamil film Chitthi. It stars Padmini, Feroz Khan, Rajesh Khanna, Pran, Nazima, O. P. Ralhan in pivotal roles, along with Kanhaiyalal, David, Lalita Pawar, Leela Chitnis in supporting roles. The film's music is by Ravi. The film is totally revolving around the character of Parvati's life. The film deals with how Parvati (played by Padmini), who is in true love with Anand (Feroz Khan), is forced by circumstances to marry Manoharlal (Pran) against wishes of her brother Suresh (Rajesh Khanna) and later is tested by life to show whether after marriage to Manoharlal, she is truly affectionate to Manoharlal.

Plot 
Parvati (Padmini) is the elder daughter of a family with eight children who is the primary bread earner of her house. Her aim is to bring up her family position and marry off all her sisters, which include a dumb girl. So she spends her whole life and struggles hard to educate her brother Suresh (Rajesh Khanna) and make him a doctor so that he can lend her a helping hand. Though she works hard, she smiles at times when she meets Anand (Feroz Khan), for whom she has a liking, but her circumstances prevent her moving further.

Manoharlal (Pran), an aged rich man and father of six children wants to marry again and searches for a bride and keeps an eye on Parvati. A proposal for marriage is raised on his behalf, to which Suresh and Parvati's mother do not accept, even though he has money. But Parvati accepts the proposal on the grounds that her family position will improve if she marries him. Suresh tries his level best to make her back-off from the marriage, but she does not accept it. Parvati marries Manoharlal and steps into his family.

Manoharlal's family members, who are against his marriage, do not welcome Parvati to their home due to fear of the step-mother. Suresh worries about the situation of her sister in the new home, but Parvati manages to win the love of all her husband's children. Parvati spends most of the time with the children and this irritates her husband. So she behaves in the way which is liked by her husband, but not liked by herself. At times, he suspects the fidelity of his wife and assumes that she has an affair with some other man and tortures her. Suresh and Manoharlal's sister Asha (Nazima) get attracted towards each other, but it is strongly opposed by Manoharlal. Hence he stops aiding Suresh's education, but somehow Manoharlal's sister manages money for his studies by getting money from a man. Because of which, she frequently visits a hotel. Suresh passes in his final examination and cheers Parvati.

Manoharlal arranges for a groom visit for his sister. The groom looks at the bride and is shocked as he has seen her frequently coming to a hotel and assumes that she is a dirty woman earning money in a dirty way. This shocks Parvati and Manoharlal. But the fact is the money for Suresh's education is provided by none other than Anand. She also finds that he married her dumb sister Kamla. Manoharlal realises his mistake and unites his sister with Suresh and all live happily.

Cast 
Padmini as Parvati
Feroz Khan as Anand
Rajesh Khanna as Suresh
Pran as Manoharlal
Nazima as Asha
O. P. Ralhan as Ratanlal
Lalita Pawar as Manoharilal & Ratanlal's Mother
Leela Chitnis as Parvati's Mother
Mohan Choti as Gopal
Achala Sachdev as Parvati's Employee
Nana Palsikar as Parvati's Moneylender
David as Ratanlal's Moneylender
Kanhaiyalal as Pandit
Niranjan Sharma as Dinanath

Production 
Aurat is a remake of the Tamil film Chitthi (1966). Padmini, who played the titular stepmother in that film, reprised her role in this film.

Soundtrack 
All songs were written by Shakeel Badayuni.

References

External links 
 

1967 films
1960s Hindi-language films
Hindi remakes of Tamil films
Indian drama films
Films directed by S. S. Vasan
Films scored by Ravi
Gemini Studios films
1967 drama films
Hindi-language drama films